The Worcester Fragments are a collection of medieval music associated with Worcester, England.

History
The Worcester Fragments comprise 25 short pieces of vocal music. They are referred to as "fragments" because they do not exist in one unified manuscript but have been reassembled from sheets used as book-binding material in later centuries. These old materials had themselves at some stage been bundled together into several collections of flyleaves and saved in various books which had historical connections with Worcester. Once it was recognised that these scattered fragments came from the same source it was possible to piece them together, though much remained missing.

The pieces are from the late 13th century to early 14th century. None of them is longer than five minutes, with some as short as one minute long. They demonstrate a variety of musical forms from the period, including the conductus and motet. Parts of several polyphonic compositions attributed to Willelmus de Winchecumbe are included in the Worcester Fragments.

15 original leaves of the Worcester Fragments were recovered from late-medieval bindings of Worcester Cathedral Priory and are
now at the Bodleian Library in Oxford.

References 

Medieval music manuscript sources
Choral compositions
History of Worcester, England
Culture in Worcester, England
Music in Worcestershire
Bodleian Library collection